Mike Hughes (born February 11, 1997) is an American football cornerback who is a free agent. He played college football at North Carolina before transferring to Garden City Community College and later to UCF. He was drafted by the Minnesota Vikings in the first round of the 2018 NFL Draft.

Early years
Hughes attended New Bern High School, where he lettered in football, track & field, and basketball. Hughes played quarterback at New Bern. As a senior in 2014, Hughes passed for 1,263 yards and 10 touchdowns and also rushed for 1,355 yards and 22 more touchdowns, guiding his team to an undefeated season and an NCHSAA 4A state championship. He was named to the all-state team and played in the Shrine Bowl of the Carolinas. Hughes was ranked the No. 3 cornerback in North Carolina and committed to the University of North Carolina to play college football.

College career
Hughes played one year at North Carolina in 2015. In October 2015, he was suspended along with M. J. Stewart, and was charged with misdemeanor assault charges from an altercation that had occurred earlier that month. He left the team after the season and transferred to Garden City Community College, where he spent a year.

In 2017, Hughes transferred to the University of Central Florida (UCF) and participated in UCF's undefeated 2017 season which ended in UCF being named National Champions by the Colley Matrix poll. Hughes made headlines with his game-sealing 95-yard kickoff return in the November 24, 2017, War on I–4 game against the South Florida Bulls, with Orlando Sentinel writer Shannon Green remarking that the play saved the undefeated season for the Knights.

Hughes left UCF after one season, deciding to forgo his senior year and enter the 2018 NFL Draft.

Professional career

Minnesota Vikings

2018
On April 26, 2018, the Minnesota Vikings selected Hughes in the first round, 30th overall, of the 2018 NFL Draft. Hughes signed a four-year contract with the Vikings on July 19, 2018, with St. Paul Pioneer Press writer Chris Tomasson reporting that Hughes had signed a $9.87 million deal with a signing bonus of $5.256 million. In his NFL debut, he recorded a 28-yard interception return for a touchdown in the Vikings' 24–16 season-opening win over the San Francisco 49ers. On October 14, 2018, in a Week 6 game against the Arizona Cardinals, Hughes suffered a torn ACL, prematurely ending his rookie season.

2019
Hughes entered the season as the fourth cornerback on the Vikings depth chart. In week 9 against the Kansas City Chiefs, Hughes forced a fumble on rookie wide receiver Mecole Hardman on a kickoff return and the ball was recovered by teammate Holton Hill in the 26–23 loss. He was placed on injured reserve on January 3, 2020 with a neck injury. He finished the season with 45 tackles, nine passes defensed, two forced fumbles, and an interception through 14 games and three starts.

2020
Hughes entered the 2020 season as the Vikings' top starting cornerback alongside rookie starter Cameron Dantzler. He was placed on injured reserve on October 30, 2020.

The Vikings declined to exercise the fifth year option on Hughes' contract on May 3, 2021, making him an unrestricted free agent following the 2021 season.

Kansas City Chiefs
On May 13, 2021, Hughes, along with a seventh-round selection in the 2022 NFL Draft, was traded to the Kansas City Chiefs in exchange for a sixth-round selection.

In Week 1 against the Cleveland Browns, Hughes intercepted a pass from Baker Mayfield late in the 4th quarter sealing a Chiefs 33–29 victory. In Week 14, Hughes had a breakout game recording nine tackles, two forced fumbles and a 23 yard fumble return for a touchdown in a 48-9 win over the Las Vegas Raiders, earning AFC Defensive Player of the Week.

Detroit Lions
On March 21, 2022, the Detroit Lions signed Hughes to a one-year contract.

References

External links
 UCF profile
 North Carolina profile
 Minnesota Vikings bio

Living people
1997 births
American football cornerbacks
American football return specialists
Garden City Broncbusters football players
Minnesota Vikings players
Kansas City Chiefs players
North Carolina Tar Heels football players
UCF Knights football players
Sportspeople from New Bern, North Carolina
Players of American football from North Carolina
Detroit Lions players